Muhammad ibn Sa'd ibn Abi Waqqas was a commander, particularly known for his role in the rebellion of Ibn al-Ash'ath in Iraq against the Umayyad Caliphate.

Life
Muhammad was a son of Sa'd ibn Abi Waqqas, one of the prominent companions of the Islamic prophet Muhammad and a member of his tribe, the Quraysh. Sa'd led the Muslim conquest of Iraq in the 630s and founded Kufa, one of the two main garrison centers and provincial capitals of Iraq. Muhammad's mother, Mariya or Mawiya, belonged to the South Arabian Kinda tribe, which established an important presence in Kufa. He and his full brother, Umar ibn Sa'd, were the most politically active of Sa'd's many children.

While his brother Umar fought for the Umayyad Caliphate, attaining infamy for killing the Islamic prophet's grandson Husayn ibn Ali at the Battle of Karbala in 680, Muhammad generally stood against the Umayyads. During the Battle of al-Harra in 683, when an Umayyad army was suppressing a rebellion in Medina, Muhammad fought in the ranks of the Medinans. He is reported by an account in the 9th-century history of al-Tabari to have pursued a troop of fleeing Umayyad troops, attacking them until retreating when the Umayyad field victory became clear. In another account, his attack against the Umayyad troops after they were ordered by their commander to halt fighting is implied to have provoked a renewed assault by the Umayyad army, which ended in the killings of more Medinan men, the 'compromising' of women, and raiding of property in the town. He probably fled Medina soon afterward, but evidently returned during the governorship of al-Hajjaj ibn Yusuf in 692–694, as he is mentioned as part of a Medinan delegation to the Umayyad caliph Abd al-Malik petitioning for al-Hajjaj's dismissal.

Muhammad afterward moved back to Iraq where he became a supporter of the mass Iraqi rebellion led by the Kufan Kindite noble and commander Ibn al-Ash'ath. At the Battle of Dayr al-Jamajim in 701 he served as the commander of Ibn al-Ash'ath's infantry. They were defeated by the Syrian troops of the Umayyad Caliphate under al-Hajjaj, who had become Iraq's governor in 694. Muhammad then took control of the city of al-Mada'in (Ctesiphon) where many of the rebels later gathered, only to leave for Basra upon the approach of al-Hajjaj. Muhammad probably joined Ibn al-Ash'ash at the subsequent Battle of Maskin where they were again defeated, practically putting an end to the rebellion.

The historian Asad Ahmed assumes Muhammad fled with Ibn al-Ash'ash to Sijistan and then took refuge with the Zunbil. In any case, Muhammad split from Ibn al-Ash'ath and body of the rebels, and took up position in Khurasan, and gave his allegiance to Abd al-Rahman ibn Abbas al-Hashimi. He was captured by the governor of Khurasan, Yazid ibn al-Muhallab, who sent him to al-Hajjaj. The latter summoned him, declared him a malcontent and rebel, and then executed him.

Descendants
Muhammad fathered a number of children by slave concubines. His descendants were not involved in political or military affairs, but a number became transmitters of historical or religious reports. His son Isma'il and grandson Abu Bakr ibn Isma'il are cited as sources by the 9th-century historian al-Tabari.

References

Bibliography

People executed by the Umayyad Caliphate
Banu Zuhrah
Rebels of the medieval Islamic world
People of the Second Fitna
People from Kufa
People from Medina